Sea angels (clade Gymnosomata) are a large group of small free-swimming sea slugs, not to be confused with Cnidarians (Jellyfish and other similar creatures), classified into six different families. They are pelagic opisthobranchs in the clade Gymnosomata within the larger mollusc clade Heterobranchia. Sea angels were previously referred to as a type of pteropod.

Sea angels are also sometimes known as "cliones" but this is potentially misleading because the family Clionidae is just one of the families within this clade.

Recent molecular data suggest the Gymnosomata form a sister group to the Thecosomata (other planktonic, weakly or nonmineralized gastropods), but this long-standing hypothesis has also had some recent detractors. Fossils of the group go back to the Middle Frasnian stage of the Late Devonian period.

Distribution 

These organisms have a wide geographic range, from polar regions, under sea ice, to equatorial (tropic) seas.

Description
In this clade, the foot of the gastropod has developed into wing-like flapping appendages (parapodia) and larval sea angels discard their embryonic shells a few days after hatching. Both adaptations suit their free-swimming oceanic lives. The adaptations also explain the common name sea angel and the scientific name of the order: From Greek gymnos meaning "naked" and soma meaning "body".

Sea angels are gelatinous, mostly transparent, and very small, with the largest species (Clione limacina) reaching 5 cm. C. limacina is a polar species; those found in warmer waters are far smaller. Some species of sea angels feed exclusively on sea butterflies; the angels have terminal mouths with the radula common to mollusks, and tentacles to grasp their prey, sometimes with suckers similar to cephalopods.

This is about twice as fast as their prey, the sea butterfly. It is not yet clear whether the sea angel uses its swimming appendages as 'rowing paddles' or as 'wings'.

Another large polar species of sea angel, Clione antarctica, defends itself from predators by synthesizing a previously unknown molecule, pteroenone. Because of this secretion, predators will not eat the sea angel. A species of amphipod takes advantage of this trait: The amphipod will seize an individual of C. antarctica out of the water column, and carry it around for protection. Local population density of C. antarctica may reach extraordinary levels; up to 300 animals per cubic metre have been recorded.

Behavior 
Gymnosomata are carnivorous, feeding only on their fellow pteropods, the Thecosomata. Their lifestyles have coevolved with those of their prey, with their feeding strategy adapting to the morphology and consistency of the thecosome shell.

Their hunting strategies are variable; some forms are ambush predators, sitting and waiting for their prey; whilst others actively pursue their prey; their metabolic rate is closely linked to that of their prey species. Even the size of the gymnosomes is correlated to the size of their prey, which they recognize by means of touch and grab using their sometimes-suckered buccal cones. A combination of hooks and a toothed radula are employed to scour the flesh from the thecosomes' shells.

Gymnosomes slowly beat their wing-like parapodia in a rowing motion to propel their "perfectly streamlined" bodies through the upper 20 m of the water column. Although usually slow-moving, beating their wings once or twice per second, they are capable of bursts of speed when they need to pursue their prey, calling a separate suite of muscles into action to obtain the higher beat frequency.

Reproduction and development
Like many gastropods, sea angels are simultaneous hermaphrodites with internal fertilization. A fertilized animal later releases a gelatinous egg mass, and the eggs float freely until hatching. Their embryonic shells are lost within the first few days after hatching.

The gymnosomes, like other shell-less opisthobranchs, discard their shells at metamorphosis, with the retractor muscles being severed and the shell lost.
The group does not truly, therefore, lack a shell. Few larval shells have been described (and consequently an understanding of their fossil record is as yet unknown).

Taxonomy

The other suborder of pteropods, Thecosomata, is superficially similar to sea angels, but are not closely related; some authorities include both Thecosomata and Gymnosomata as separate branches of the order Pteropoda, whereas others list them as distinct orders within the subclass Heterobranchia. They have larger, broader parapodia, and most of that species retain a shell; they are commonly known as sea butterflies.

In the new taxonomy of Bouchet & Rocroi (2005), the clade Gymnosomata is arranged as follows:

Superfamily Clionoidea:
family Clionidae
family Cliopsidae
family Notobranchaeidae
family Pneumodermatidae
Superfamily Hydromyloidea:
family Hydromylidae
family Laginiopsidae

The group that used to be the family Thliptodontidae is treated as Thliptodontinae, a subfamily of the family Clionidae.

Footnotes

References

Further reading 
 Mollusca - The Southern Synthesis Order Gymnosomata by L. Newman pages 985–989; Beesley, P.L., Ross, G.J.B. & Wells, A (eds) -

External links

 list of Clione entries in the Sea Slug Forum: 
 Video of a sea angel in motion: https://web.archive.org/web/20040607043553/http://www.biol.sc.edu/~vogt/courses/neuro/neurobehavior.html#clione
Mikko's Phylogeny Archive
Reconstruction of the phylogeny of Opisthobranchia; Journal of Molluscan studies

Euopisthobranchia